Dmitri Valeryevich Markitesov (born 22 March 2001) is a Russian football player. He plays as a central midfielder or left winger for FC Rodina Moscow.

Club career
He made his debut in the Russian Football National League for FC Spartak-2 Moscow on 11 March 2019 in a game against FC Zenit-2 Saint Petersburg.

He made his Russian Premier League debut for FC Spartak Moscow on 27 June 2020 in a game against FC Ufa, replacing Roman Zobnin in the 90th minute.

On 15 July 2022, Markitesov signed a three-year contract with FC Rodina Moscow.

Career statistics

References

External links
 
 
 Profile by Russian Football National League
 

2001 births
Footballers from Moscow
Living people
Russian footballers
Russia youth international footballers
Association football midfielders
FC Spartak-2 Moscow players
FC Spartak Moscow players
Russian Premier League players
Russian First League players